Peter Jutzeler (9 May 1940 – 28 September 2020) was a Swiss wrestler. He competed at the 1964 Summer Olympics and the 1968 Summer Olympics.

References

External links
 

1940 births
2020 deaths
Swiss male sport wrestlers
Olympic wrestlers of Switzerland
Wrestlers at the 1964 Summer Olympics
Wrestlers at the 1968 Summer Olympics
People from Meilen District
Sportspeople from the canton of Zürich
20th-century Swiss people